HD 114729 is a 7th magnitude star approximately  away in the constellation of Centaurus. Like the Sun (G2V), it is a yellow dwarf (spectral type G0V). It is about the same mass as the Sun, but twice as luminous. That indicates a much greater age, perhaps over 10 billion years.

Planetary system
In 2003 the California and Carnegie Planet Search team announced the discovery of a planet orbiting the star. This planet orbits twice as far away from the star as Earth to the Sun and orbits very eccentrically. It has mass at least 95% (0.840) that of Jupiter and thus a minimum of 267 times the mass of Earth.

See also 
 List of extrasolar planets

References

External links
 

G-type main-sequence stars
Planetary systems with one confirmed planet
Centaurus (constellation)
Durchmusterung objects
114729
064459